Bill Buckner's 1986 World Series error was a baseball play that occurred in Game 6 of the 1986 World Series on October 25, 1986, at Shea Stadium in Queens, New York.

Buckner's tenth-inning error in Game 6 of the 1986 World Series against the New York Mets remains one of the most memorable plays in baseball history; it was long considered part of a curse on the Red Sox that kept them from winning the World Series, and led to years of fan anger and public mockery that Buckner handled graciously before being embraced by Red Sox fans again after their 2004 World Series victory.

The play is often known as the "Buckner play" and is blamed on the first baseman, but Mookie Wilson's smart at-bat and speed also affected the course of events. (If Buckner had made that play and Wilson had been safe, Howard Johnson would have been the next batter with runners on first and third. If Wilson had been put out by Buckner, the game would have gone into an 11th inning.)

Background
During the  season, Buckner started all 162 games and shattered his own big league record with 184 assists. Toward the end of the  season, he was hobbled by leg injuries and struggled throughout the playoffs.

In 1986, it appeared that the Boston Red Sox's fortunes were about to change. The team's hitting and offense had remained strong with Jim Rice, Dwight Evans, Bill Buckner, Don Baylor, and future Hall of Famer Wade Boggs who would win 5 batting titles. Roger Clemens led the pitching staff, going 24–4 with a 2.48 ERA to win both the American League Cy Young and Most Valuable Player awards.  Clemens became the first starting pitcher to win both awards since Vida Blue in 1971. This feat has been replicated twice since then (Justin Verlander in 2011, Clayton Kershaw in 2014).

The Red Sox won the AL East for the first time in 11 seasons, prompting a playoff series against the California Angels in the American League Championship Series. The teams split the first two games in Boston, but the Angels won the next two games at their home stadium, taking a 3–1 lead in the series. With the Angels poised to win the series, the Red Sox trailed 5–2 heading into the ninth inning of Game 5. A two-run homer by Baylor cut the lead to one. With two outs and a runner on, and one strike away from elimination, Dave Henderson homered off Donnie Moore to put Boston up 6–5. Although the Angels tied the game in the bottom of the ninth, the Red Sox won in the 11th on a Henderson sacrifice fly off Moore. The Red Sox then found themselves with six- and seven-run wins at Fenway Park in Games 6 and 7 to win the American League title.

Before the 1986 New York Mets season, Nelson Doubleday Jr. sold his publishing company to the (then) West German multinational corporation Bertelsmann AG, and used the proceeds from the sale to buy the Mets in his own name for $81 million.  He then sold a half-stake to Fred Wilpon, making them equal partners in the team.

Unlike the league champion Mets of 1969 or 1973, the 1986 Mets hit the ground running, breaking away from the rest of the division early and dominating throughout the entire year. They won 20 of their first 24 games, clinched the East Division title on September 17, and finished the year 108–54, which tied with the 1975 Cincinnati Reds for the third highest win total in National League history, behind the 1906 Chicago Cubs (116) and the 1909 Pittsburgh Pirates (110). The relative lack of excitement during the regular season was more than compensated for by the spectacularly suspenseful and dramatic post-season series.

Postseason
In the National League Championship Series, the Mets faced their fellow 1962 expansion team, the Houston Astros. Unlike the Mets, the Astros had yet to win a pennant, but had former Mets pitchers Mike Scott, the league's Cy Young Award winner, and fireballer Nolan Ryan leading their pitching staff. The Mets took a two-games-to-one lead with a come-from-behind walk-off home run by Lenny Dykstra. In Game 6, the Mets turned a 3–0 ninth-inning deficit into a sixteen-inning marathon victory to clinch the National League pennant and earn their third World Series appearance, their first since 1973.

After New York scored three runs in the top of the 9th to force extra innings, they scored three more runs in the top of the 16th. Houston soon answered with two of its own before Jesse Orosco fanned Kevin Bass to end the game. The Astros would have to wait until 2005 to finally win their first pennant.

In the postseason for the first time in his career, Mookie Wilson batted just .115 in the NLCS against the Astros. However, he scored the only run allowed by NLCS MVP Mike Scott in Game 4 of the series, and drove in and scored a run in the ninth inning of Game 6, when the Mets scored three runs in their last at bat to send the game into extra innings. He was batting a far better .273 in the World Series when he came to the plate in the tenth inning of Game 6.

The setup

World Series Game 6

The 1986 Red Sox were leading the heavily favored New York Mets 3 games to 2 in the 1986 World Series when Game 6 went into extra innings. For his part, Buckner was batting just .143 against Mets pitching, and he was 0–for–5 in Game 6. When the Sox scored 2 runs in the top of the tenth, Boston manager John McNamara chose to have Buckner take the field in the bottom of the inning instead of bringing Dave Stapleton in as a defensive replacement for the ailing Buckner, as he had in Games 1, 2, and 5.

The play
After retiring Wally Backman and Keith Hernandez, Red Sox relief pitcher Calvin Schiraldi surrendered singles to the next three batters, Gary Carter, Kevin Mitchell and Ray Knight, to bring the score to 5–4 with runners on first and third. With Mookie Wilson stepping up to the plate, Bob Stanley replaced Schiraldi on the mound. During his ten pitch at-bat, Wilson avoided being hit by a wild pitch that scored Kevin Mitchell from third and tied the score. Two pitches later, he hit a slow roller to Bill Buckner at first base.

Aware of Wilson's speed, Buckner tried to rush the play. As a result, the ball rolled beside his glove, through his legs and into right field, allowing Ray Knight to score the winning run from second base.

Had Buckner fielded the ball with Wilson safe at first, the score would have remained tied for the next Mets batter. Had Buckner put out Wilson at first base -- either by himself or by throwing to a covering Stanley -- Game 6 would have gone to an 11th inning.

The calls

Jack Buck
The national radio coverage of the 1986 World Series was handled by CBS Radio Sports with Jack Buck calling the play-by-play alongside then Detroit Tigers manager Sparky Anderson. The following is a word-for-word transcript of Buck and Anderson's commentary during the final moments of Game 6:
J = Jack Buck
S = Sparky Anderson

J: Wild pitch. Here's the pitch to Mookie Wilson. Winning run at second. Ground ball to first, it is a run...an error! An error by Buckner! The winning run scores! The Mets win it 6 to 5 with three in the tenth! The ball went right through the legs of Buckner and the Mets with two men out and nobody on have scored three times to bring about a seventh game, which will be played here tomorrow night. Folks, it was unbelievable. An error, right through the legs of Buckner. There were two on, nobody out, a single by Carter, a single by Mitchell, a single by Ray Knight, a wild pitch, an error by Buckner. Three in the ninth for the Mets. They've won the game 6-5 and we shall play here... tomorrow night! Well, open up the history book, folks, we've got an entry for you...What do you think, Sparky?

S: I never seen nothing like it. Here you got two out, two run lead, you figure Carter up, he can't even hurt you. He gets a base hit, another base hit, another base hit...wild pitches, ball rolls through the guys legs. I've never seen nothing like it, Jack.

Bob Murphy
Locally in New York, radio coverage the 1986 World Series was broadcast on WHN with Bob Murphy and Gary Thorne on the call.

Murphy: A slow ground ball went right through the legs of Buckner down the
right field line. The Mets have won the ballgame. Three runs in the bottom
half of the 10th inning. Three runs in the 10th inning. They were down to
their final strike twice in the bottom half of the 10th inning, they win
the ballgame. I thought the ground ball was going to be foul, it stayed
fair. It went right through the legs of Billy Buckner and down the right
field line.

Thorne: Bob, what is Billy Buckner doing in the game in the bottom of 10th
inning?

Vin Scully
The 1986 World Series was televised by NBC with Vin Scully on the call alongside Joe Garagiola. Scully's call of the final play in Game 6 of the 1986 World Series would quickly become an iconic one to baseball fans, with the normally calm Scully growing increasingly excited:

Scully then remained silent for more than three minutes, letting the pictures and the crowd noise tell the story. Scully resumed with

After the top of the tenth, NBC began setting up in the visiting clubhouse for what they believed was the inevitable postgame victory celebration by the Boston Red Sox. The Commissioner's Trophy had been brought into the Red Sox clubhouse along with several bottles of champagne, and Bob Costas was to preside over the presentation. However, after Bob Stanley's wild pitch in the bottom of the tenth, everything was quickly struck and removed from the room before the Red Sox returned. Costas later recalled the removal of all the equipment for the postgame celebration as being "like a scene change in a Broadway musical. In, out, gone, not a trace."

Aftermath

Game 7
Boston led Game 7 by a 3–0 score heading into the bottom of the sixth inning when New York rallied again, scoring 3 runs off Bruce Hurst to tie the game, and 3 more off of Schiraldi in the seventh to take a 6–3 lead. Buckner was 2–for–4 in the game, and scored 1 of Boston's 2 runs in the eighth. However, the Mets also scored twice in the eighth and won 8–5, for their second and most recent World Series championship. Mookie Wilson meanwhile, went one for three in Game 7, scoring one of three runs the Mets plated in the sixth inning while trailing 3–0.

Mets' pitcher Jesse Orosco ending the game by striking out Marty Barrett. Orosco then threw his glove high in the air and dropped to his knees while catcher Gary Carter ran to the mound to embrace him.  This scene was captured on film and would become an iconic image, taken by Mets photographer George Kalinsky, in Mets baseball history and in all of baseball. The Mets remained the only team to come within one strike of losing a World Series before recovering to become World Champions, until the St. Louis Cardinals did it in 2011. The Mets winning this World Series is the highest-rated single World Series game to date. The Mets were also the first team to win a World Series in a potential clinching game delayed by rain, as Game 7 was postponed by one day.

Curses
Regardless of any of the other perceived shortcomings that led to Boston's loss in the 1986 World Series, Buckner's error epitomized the "Curse of the Bambino" in the minds of Red Sox fans, and he soon became the scapegoat for a frustrated fan base.

While not falling under the curse in the traditional sense, Buckner's infamous gaffe in Game 6 of the 1986 World Series can also be interpreted to fit the Ex-Cubs Factor and/or the Curse of the Billy Goat. Upon video analysis, Buckner, a former Chicago Cub for seven seasons, was shown to be wearing a Cubs batting glove under his mitt when he made the error.

Buckner, the Red Sox, and the Mets beyond 1986
Buckner began receiving death threats and was heckled and booed by some of his own home fans, often with the false belief or implication that his play alone could have instantly won the series for the Red Sox. Meanwhile, he was the focal point of derision from the fans of opposing teams on the road—especially when he faced the Mets in spring training of 1987—and during his first regular-season at bat at Yankee Stadium. He made his 2,500th career hit on May 19, an RBI single in a 4-1 road loss to the Kansas City Royals, but the Red Sox released Buckner on July 23 after he recorded a .273 batting average, 2 home runs, and 42 RBI in 75 games.

After spending his last few seasons with the California Angels, Kansas City Royals, and the Red Sox, Buckner became the 21st player in MLB history to play in four decades. He ended his career with 2,715 hits and 498 doubles, having batted over .300 seven times. Buckner led his league in assists four times, with his 1985 mark remaining the American League (AL) record. He retired with the fourth-most assists by a first baseman (1,351) in major league history despite not playing the position regularly until he was 27 years old. After retiring as a player, Buckner became a real estate developer in Idaho. He coached a number of Minor League Baseball (MiLB) teams before leaving baseball in 2014.

The Red Sox returned to the postseason in 1988. With the club in fourth place midway through the 1988 season at the All-Star break, manager John McNamara was fired and replaced by Joe Morgan on July 15. Immediately the club won 12 games in a row, and 19 of 20 overall, to surge to the AL East title in what would be referred to as Morgan Magic. But the magic was short-lived, as the team was swept by the Oakland Athletics in the ALCS. Ironically, the MVP of that Series was former Red Sox pitcher and Baseball Hall of Fame player Dennis Eckersley, who saved all four wins for Oakland.

While the 1986 Mets were undeniably strong, they also gained infamy for off-the-field controversy. Both Strawberry and Gooden were youngsters who wound up burning out long before their time because of various substance abuse and personal problems. Hernandez's cocaine abuse was the subject of persistent rumors even before he joined the Mets, but he publicly acknowledged his addiction in 1985 and made a successful recovery. Lenny Dykstra's reputation was recently tainted by allegations of steroid use and gambling problems.
Instead of putting together a winning dynasty, the problems caused the Mets to soon fall apart.
Despite Darryl Strawberry's numerous off-the-field mishaps, he remains the Mets' all-time leader in home runs and runs batted in.

This World Series championship by the Mets had a strange twist: Lou Gorman, the general manager of the Red Sox, was vice president, player personnel, of the Mets from 1980 to 1983. Working under Mets' GM Frank Cashen, with whom Gorman served with the Orioles, he helped lay the foundation for the Mets' championship.

References in popular culture

The ball was on loan for a time from Swirsky to the Mets to display in their Mets Hall of Fame and Museum, and it was among the most popular artifacts for fans to see. On May 3, 2012, Swirsky sold the ball through Heritage Auctions for $418,250.

Buckner made a cameo appearance at the beginning of the sports parody film The Comebacks and
was featured in an episode of the HBO series Curb Your Enthusiasm. Also, he made a cameo appearance in the pilot episode of the short-lived sitcom Inside Schwartz, advising the title character to "just let it go." In 1995, Buckner appeared along with Michael Jordan, Stan Musial, Willie Mays and Ken Griffey Jr. in a commercial for the shoemaker Nike in which Spike Lee, in character as Mars Blackmon, compares Jordan's baseball skills to Musial, Mays, Griffey and Buckner. The punch line is a visual reference to Buckner's 1986 World Series error. His famous 1986 World Series miscue is also referenced in the films Celtic Pride, Rounders, and Fever Pitch. The play also is referenced in an episode of The Simpsons titled "Brother's Little Helper" and in the musical Johnny Baseball. On October 23, 2008, during former Federal Reserve chairman Alan Greenspan's testimony in House hearings on the economic crisis of 2008, Representative John Yarmuth referred to Greenspan as one of "three Bill Buckners." Buckner and Mookie Wilson appeared in an MLB Network commercial for the 2016 postseason, "Catching Up", marking the 30th anniversary of the 1986 World Series and their roles in it.

Buckner is mentioned in The Areas of My Expertise in a series of New England sports references. In the book, John Hodgman describes a (fictional) radio personality and recounts the premonition she had regarding Buckner's infamous error in Game 6 of the 1986 World Series.

The Leonard P. Zakim Bunker Hill Memorial Bridge, in Boston, is colloquially referred to locals as the Bill Buckner Bridge because traffic goes between the "legs" of the bridge, like Buckner's 1986 World Series fielding error.  The nickname is now spoken fondly, since Buckner and Sox fans thought fondly of each other after the 2004 World Series win.

Similar plays
Leon Durham is himself, widely remembered for an error that he made at first base during the 1984 National League Championship Series. In the bottom of the seventh inning in the decisive fifth game between Durham's Chicago Cubs and the San Diego Padres, the Padres sent pinch-hitter Tim Flannery to face the Cubs' ace pitcher Rick Sutcliffe.

Through the top of the sixth inning, the Cubs had a 3–0 lead, aided by Durham's home run off Eric Show in the first inning. In the bottom of the sixth inning, the Padres cut the Cubs' lead to 3–2 with a pair of singles by Alan Wiggins and Tony Gwynn, a walk to Steve Garvey, and sacrifice flies by Graig Nettles and Terry Kennedy. The bottom of the seventh inning kicked off with Carmelo Martínez walking on four pitches from Sutcliffe. Garry Templeton then sacrificed Martínez to second, setting things up for Tim Flannery. Martinez would then score when Flannery hit a sharp grounder that trickled through Leon Durham's legs for an error.

The error became known as the "Gatorade Glove Play" because before taking his position in the field that inning, Gatorade was spilled on Durham's glove. Some Cub fans believe the Gatorade spilled on Durham's glove amounted to a curse, similar to the goat and Bartman curses of Cub lore.

The play would also turn out to be very similar, in style and effect, to Bill Buckner's much-discussed error in the 1986 World Series. The coincidental connection between these two events is that Durham had been moved from the outfield to first base during the 1984 season, replacing Buckner after the Cubs traded him to the Boston Red Sox for pitcher Dennis Eckersley. Buckner's error, like Durham's, would be seen as turning a post-season series around. The same joke even circulated for both incidents: That they had been despondent, jumped in front of a moving truck, and "the truck went between their legs".

The Padres wound up winning the game 6–3 to reach the World Series for the first time ever. The Cubs had won the first 2 games of the series (1984 marked the last time that the League Championship Series was a best-of-five series) over the Padres. Incidentally, Durham went 3-for-20 in the NLCS, garnering two of his three hits in the final two games on home runs (his shot in Game 4 had given the Cubs a 3–2 lead).

References

External links
Red Sox first baseman Bill Buckner lets ground ball roll through his legs
Is Buckner really to blame for the '86 World Series?
World Series Memories: 35 Years Ago, Bill Buckner Infamously Had a Ball Slip Through His Legs, Giving the Mets New Life Against the Red Sox
Buckner's career overshadowed by miscue in 1986 World Series
Bill Buckner, forever known for 1986 World Series error, dies at 69

Boston Red Sox postseason
New York Mets postseason
1986 Major League Baseball season
World Series games
Historic baseball plays
October 1986 sports events in the United States
Baseball competitions in New York City
1986 in sports in New York City